Leonidas Giannelos (7 July 1947, in Makrakomi, Phthiotis – 10 December 2012, in Lamia) was a Greek international football player, one of the most important to come out of Central Greece.

Sources 
 Newspaper "Μακρακώμης λόγος" - Article: "Το σπίρτο"

References 

PAS Lamia 1964 players
Association football forwards
Greek footballers
People from Makrakomi
1947 births
2012 deaths
Footballers from Central Greece